Proton AG is a Swiss technology company offering privacy-focused online services. It was founded in 2014 by a group of scientists who met at CERN and created Proton Mail. Proton is headquartered in Geneva, Switzerland. It is supported by FONGIT (the Fondation Genevoise pour l'Innovation Technologique) and the European Commission.

The company's products are Proton Mail, Proton VPN, Proton Calendar, and Proton Drive.

History 
Proton Mail was launched in public beta on 16 May 2014 by a group of scientists who met at CERN. The company was initially financed through a community crowdfunding effort and initially incorporated as Proton Technologies AG in July 2014 and subsequently shortened to Proton AG. In June 2017, the company launched its second product, Proton VPN.

On 8 April 2022, Proton acquired French email aliasing startup SimpleLogin.

On 14 April 2022, Proton Technologies AG shortened its name to Proton AG as part of its unifying rebrand.

On 25 May 2022, Proton AG unified their products under a single subscription. The user interfaces and logos for its services were also revamped to have a more consistent design.

Products

Proton Mail 

Proton Mail was released as a public beta on 16 May 2014 as an end-to-end encrypted email service after a year of crowdfunding. Proton Mail 2.0 was released 14 August 2015, with open source front-end clients and a rewritten codebase.

Proton VPN 

After over a year of crowdfunding, Proton Mail released Proton VPN on 22 May 2017, a secure VPN service provider. It has a no-logging policy, is located in Switzerland, and has DNS and WebRTC IP address leakage prevention. It is accessible online through Tor, the clearnet, and its mobile applications.

On 21 January 2020, Proton announced that Proton VPN would now be open source, to allow independent security experts to analyze it, becoming the first VPN service to do so, simultaneously announcing that an independent security audit had been conducted.

On 1 May 2020, Proton VPN reported that they had a total of 809 servers, located in 50 different countries, all owned and operated by itself. By 6 July 2022, the company had a total of 1786 servers, located in 63 countries, with all new and preexisting servers operated and owned by Proton.

Proton Calendar 
Released for public beta on 30 December 2019, Proton Calendar is a fully encrypted calendar app. As of 14 April 2021, it is available to all users of Proton Mail.

Proton Drive 
Released for public beta on 16 November 2020, Proton Drive is a cloud storage solution with end-to-end encryption. As of 22 September 2022, it is available to all users of Proton Mail.

Location and security 
Both Proton Mail and Proton VPN are located in Switzerland to avoid any surveillance or information requests from countries under the Fourteen Eyes, and/or under government surveillance laws like the U.S.'s Patriot Act or outside the bounds of law.

They are also located in Switzerland because of its strict privacy laws.

Data centers 
Proton Mail maintains and owns its own server hardware and network in order to avoid utilizing a third party. It maintains two data centers, one in Lausanne and another in Attinghausen (in the former K7 military bunker under  of granite rock) as a backup. Since the data centers are located in Switzerland, they are legally outside of US and EU jurisdiction. Under Swiss law, all surveillance requests from foreign countries must go through a Swiss court and are subject to international treaties. Prospective surveillance targets are promptly notified and can appeal the request in court.

Each data center uses load balancing across web, mail, and SQL servers, redundant power supply, hard drives with full disk encryption, and exclusive use of Linux and other open-source software. In December 2014, Proton Mail joined the RIPE NCC in an effort to have more direct control over the surrounding Internet infrastructure.

Funding 
Proton AG was initially funded through crowdfunding and now is through its paid subscription. However, the company has been  partially funded by FONGIT.

In March 2021, Proton confirmed that the shares held by Charles Rivers Ventures had been transferred to FONGIT.

References 

Software companies of Switzerland
Swiss companies established in 2014
Technology companies established in 2014